Gambell Army Airfield is a former United States Army airfield located in Gambell, a city in the Nome Census Area of the U.S. state of Alaska.

History
Gambell Army Airfield was used as a transport base during World War II, facilitating the transit of Lend-Lease aircraft to the Soviet Union. It was also used by the USAAF as an emergency landing field for aircraft patrolling the west coast of Alaska.

See also

 Alaska World War II Army Airfields
 Air Transport Command
 Northwest Staging Route

References

Airfields of the United States Army Air Forces in Alaska
Airports in the Nome Census Area, Alaska
Installations of the United States Army in Alaska